Ion Cașa (4 December 1926 – 1999) was a Romanian alpine skier. He competed in the men's downhill at the 1952 Winter Olympics.

References

1926 births
1999 deaths
Romanian male alpine skiers
Olympic alpine skiers of Romania
Alpine skiers at the 1952 Winter Olympics
People from Bușteni